Ozark Township is a township in Anderson County, Kansas, United States. As of the 2010 census, its population was 578.

History
Ozark Township was established in 1859.

Geography

References
 USGS Geographic Names Information System (GNIS)

External links
 City-Data.com

Townships in Anderson County, Kansas
Townships in Kansas